David Campbell Bannerman (born 28 May 1960 in Bombay, India) is a British Conservative Party politician who served as Member of the European Parliament (MEP) for the East of England from 2009 to 2019. He is currently Chairman of The Freedom Association. He served as Deputy Leader of UK Independence Party (UKIP) from 2006 until 2010, when he was replaced by Paul Nuttall.

Before joining UKIP, he was a Conservative activist who came to prominence as Chairman of the Bow Group.  He stood for Parliament as a Conservative at the 1997 election in Glasgow Rutherglen and in 2001 in Warwick and Leamington. Campbell Bannerman joined UKIP in 2004, and was elected in 2009. In 2011, he defected back to the Conservative Party.

He has been a long-term critic of the European Union, and has had many roles in eurosceptic advocacy groups. In 2015, he became co-chairman of a new eurosceptic pressure group, Conservatives for Britain. In 2016, he joined the political advisory board of Leave Means Leave.

Early life
Campbell Bannerman is a distant relative of former Prime Minister Henry Campbell-Bannerman who led the Liberal Party to a landslide victory over the Conservatives in the 1906 General Election.

Campbell Bannerman was educated at Bryanston School, the University of Edinburgh (MA, Economics and Politics) and at the Wharton School of the University of Pennsylvania.

Professional career

Campbell Bannerman started work as a trainee accountant with Binder Hamlyn before becoming an account executive with Allen, Brady & Marsh. After working for HDM he became Executive Director of Vantagepoint Communications.  Between 1997 and 1999 he was Communications Director/External Affairs Director of the Association of Train Operating Companies, before becoming Head of Communications at United News & Media in 2000.

Campbell Bannerman currently  works for public relations firm Burson Marsteller.

Political career

Conservatives: 1992–2004
Campbell Bannerman was a member of the Conservative Party, as a borough councillor in Royal Tunbridge Wells from 1992–1996. He was chairman of the Bow Group from 1993 to 1994 and Special Advisor to Sir Patrick Mayhew (then MP for Tunbridge Wells) from 1996 to 1997 while Sir Patrick was Secretary of State for Northern Ireland.

In 1997, he stood for the Conservatives in Glasgow Rutherglen and in 2001 in Warwick and Leamington where he obtained 37.6% of the vote in second place.

UKIP: 2004–2011
After joining UKIP in 2004, Campbell Bannerman stood as that party's candidate for North Cornwall in the 2005 General Election and polled 3063 votes. He was appointed Party Chairman in December 2005, following the resignation of Petrina Holdsworth.

Outside party politics, has been a member of the London Safety Camera Partnership Project Board and was involved in the "Save Acton Mainline" Campaign.

In 2006, he stood for the leadership of the UK Independence Party, scoring third place with 1,443 votes, after Richard Suchorzewski who came a clear second. After that election, he was appointed Deputy Leader by Nigel Farage, who had won the election.

During the 2007 Scottish Parliament Elections, he stood as UKIP's Holyrood Regional List candidate for the Highlands and Islands. His campaign gained UKIP 1,287 votes (0.7%), down 0.5% from UKIP's 2003 campaign. In 2009, he was elected to the European Parliament after UKIP won 19.6% of the vote in the East of England region.

Bannerman was the main author of UKIP's 2010 election manifesto. Following the resignation of UKIP leader Lord Pearson, in 2010 Campbell Bannerman announced his intention to stand for the leadership of UKIP for a second time, but came third, behind Nigel Farage and Tim Congdon.

Conservative: 2011–present
Campbell Bannerman returned to the Conservative Party on 24 May 2011 and sat with the European Conservatives and Reformists group as a Conservative MEP in the European Parliament until the end of his term in 2019. From 2014 he served as chairman of the Parliament's delegation to Iraq. In July 2018, while commenting on media suggestions that British fighters for the Islamic State should be tried under treason laws, he additionally suggested that treason laws should cover British citizens with "extreme loyalty" to the European Union. This comment led to widespread criticism, with Labour Party MP Virendra Sharma alleging that he was "suggesting putting the knife into free speech" and European Parliament Brexit representative Guy Verhofstadt calling his comments "insane".

In what was his final contribution as a Member of the European Parliament, during a debate on the Future of Europe, Campbell Bannerman asked then-German Chancellor Angela Merkel if she believed in a European federal superstate.

In February 2020, Campbell Bannerman appeared at the Durham Union Society, speaking in favour of the motion 'Patriotism Is a Force For Good'. 

On 24 March 2022, Campbell Bannerman addressed the National Conservatism Conference on the topic 'Our Freedoms Are Threatened'. 

In April 2022, Campbell Bannerman appeared on Good Morning Britain arguing in favour of accepting Prime Minister Boris Johnson's apology after receiving a fine from the Metropolitan Police.

References

External links

UKIP seeks legal advice on jibes

1960 births
Living people
People educated at Bryanston School
Alumni of the University of Edinburgh
Wharton School of the University of Pennsylvania alumni
MEPs for England 2009–2014
MEPs for England 2014–2019
Conservative Party (UK) MEPs
UK Independence Party MEPs
Councillors in Kent
UK Independence Party parliamentary candidates
Members of the Bow Group
English people of Scottish descent
Conservative Party (UK) parliamentary candidates
Conservative Party (UK) councillors
British Eurosceptics